Niels Hansen (born 25 July 1983) is a German former professional footballer who played as a midfielder.

References

External links
 

1983 births
Living people
German footballers
Footballers from Schleswig-Holstein
Association football midfielders
Holstein Kiel players
SC Freiburg players
FC Carl Zeiss Jena players
People from Flensburg
VfL Osnabrück players
2. Bundesliga players
3. Liga players